Mateusz Gamrot (born December 11, 1990) is a Polish professional mixed martial artist. He currently competes in the Lightweight division in the Ultimate Fighting Championship (UFC). Gamrot is a former KSW Featherweight Champion and KSW Lightweight Champion. As of December 13, 2022, he is #7 in the UFC lightweight rankings.

Background
Gamrot started wrestling at the age of ten. In middle school age, he moved to a boarding school in Milicz to train there in freestyle wrestling. While studying in a technical school, he belonged to the national wrestling team where he won medals in the Polish junior and youth championships. As a 20-year-old he moved permanently to Poznań. There he trains and has a family and two children.

In 2002, he began his journey with martial arts, starting with wrestling. During his wrestling career he achieved many successes in Poland and internationally. He fought over 300 duels on the mat, wrestling, among others, at the European and World Championships. Since 2011, he has been training mixed martial arts. He gained his training experience under the supervision of an excellent trainer, Andrzej Kościelski, World Champion in wrestling.

In 2012, he won a gold medal at the European Amateur MMA Championships (Brussels) and a year later he defended the championship title again winning gold in the 70 kg category (Budapest).

Two times in a row (2013, 2014) he won the gold medal at the Polish championships in grappling in the purple stripes category (Luboń). In 2014 he won the ADCC Submission Wrestling European championships in up to 77 kg class.

Mixed martial arts career

Konfrontacja Sztuk Walki 
He made his professional MMA debut on February 4, 2012 at XFS Night of Champions, defeating Chechen Arbi Shamayev. By the end of the year he had won two more fights for the federation and then he signed with KSW. On June 8, 2013 he had his first fight in KSW, beating Mateusz Zawadzki via TKO at KSW 23: Khalidov vs. Manhoef. On September 28 at KSW 24 he defeated former UFC fighter Andre Winner on points. At KSW 27, Mateusz defeated Jefferson George on points.

On September 13, 2014 he fought for the British organization Cage Warriors, defeating Welshman Tim Newman in the 1st round at CW 72. He returned on December 6, 2014 to defeat Łukasz Chlewicki at KSW 29  via unanimous decision. At KSW 30 on February 21, 2015, he won over Brazilian Rodrigo Cavalheiro Correia by technical knockout six seconds before the final bell. Gamrot earned a Knockout of the Night bonus award with the performance.

At KSW 32: Road to Wembley, Mateusz defeated Marif Piraev via TKO in the second round, getting his tenth straight win to start his career.

KSW Lightweight Championship
On May 27, 2016 at KSW 35, he fought for the vacant KSW Lightweight Championship belt against former British BAMMA and Russian M-1 Global champion Frenchman Mansour Barnaoui. He claimed the title via unanimous decision and both fighters were awarded the Fight of the Night bonus.

At KSW 36: Materla vs. Palhares on October 1, 2016, he defended his title via heel hook against Renato Gomes Gabriel in the second round.

Gamrot faced former UFC fighter Norman Parke at KSW 39: Colosseum on May 27, 2017. He won the bout and retained the title via unanimous decision.

Gamrot rematched Norman Parke at KSW 40: Dublin on October 22, 2017. At the weigh-ins, Parke came in one pound over the championship limit and the bout was deemed a non-title bout. After the bout was stopped due to eye pokes that left Parke unable to continue, Parke shoved Gamrot's cornerman, Borys Mankowski, which resulted in Marcin Bilman, another professional fighter who was in the champion's corner, responded by landing a punch on Parke. Gamrot was subsequently fined 30% of his purse and Bilman was handed a two-year ban from KSW events.

On March 3, 2018 at KSW 42: Khalidov vs. Narkun, Gamrot defeated Grzegorz Szulakowski via keylock submission in the fourth round, defending the KSW Lightweight Championship.

Two-division champion
On December 1, 2018 at KSW 46: Narkun vs. Khalidov 2, he fought for a second belt, this time for the KSW Featherweight Championship, against submission specialist Kleber Koike Erbst, where he won the bout after a five-round domination, capturing the organization's second crown.

Vacating the titles
On May 17, 2019, in a video on Borys Mankowski's YouTube channel, Gamrot announced that he had vacated his two belts and did not renew his contract with KSW.

On March 6, 2020, KSW announced Gamrot's return to the organization. The KSW double champion was scheduled to return at KSW 53 in Lodz, Poland against the Brazilian Edimilson Souza, but due to a coronavirus pandemic the event was canceled. On July 11 he fought his third bout at KSW 53: Reborn against Norman Parke. Parke missed weight for the bout and was fined, which went to Gamrot. Gamrot won the fight in the third round via technical knockout.

On August 29, 2020, he fought his last fight under his KSW contract against Marian Ziółkowski at KSW 54: Gamrot vs. Ziółkowski, who replaced the injured Shamil Musayev. After a 5-round bout, Gamrot won via unanimous decision.

Ultimate Fighting Championship

2020
On September 17, 2020, it was announced that Gamrot signed with the Ultimate Fighting Championship.

Gamrot, as a replacement for Renato Moicano, was scheduled to face Magomed Mustafaev at UFC Fight Night: Ortega vs. The Korean Zombie on October 18, 2020. In turn, Mustafaev pulled out in early October due to undisclosed reasons. Gamrot faced fellow promotional newcomer Guram Kutateladze instead. He lost the close fight via split decision. Both fighters earned the Fight of the Night award.

2021
Gamrot faced Scott Holtzman on April 10, 2021 at UFC on ABC: Vettori vs. Holland. He won the fight via knockout in the second round. This win earned him the Performance of the Night award.

Gamrot faced Jeremy Stephens on July 17, 2021 at UFC on ESPN: Makhachev vs. Moisés. He won the fight via kimura in round one, this submission is the quickest of its kind in UFC history. This win earned him the Performance of the Night award.

As the first bout of his new four-fight contract, Gamrot faced Carlos Diego Ferreira on December 18, 2021 at UFC Fight Night: Lewis vs. Daukaus. He won the bout via TKO in round two, forcing Ferreira to submit with a knee to the body.

2022
Gamrot faced Arman Tsarukyan on June 25, 2022  at UFC on ESPN 38. He won the closely contested fight via unanimous decision. Both fighters earned the Fight of the Night award.

As the first fight of his four-fight contract, Gamrot faced Beneil Dariush on October 22, 2022 at UFC 280. He lost the fight by unanimous decision.

2023 
Gamrot, replacing Dan Hooker, faced Jalin Turner on March 4, 2023, at UFC 285. In a closely contested bout where Gamrot employed his wrestling to combat Turner’s reach advantage, he won the bout via split decision.

Championships and accomplishments

Mixed martial arts
Ultimate Fighting Championship
 Performance of the Night (Two times) vs. 
 Fight of the Night (Two times) vs. 
Fastest submission by kimura in UFC history (65 seconds) vs Jeremy Stephens
Konfrontacja Sztuk Walki
KSW Lightweight Championship (one time; former)
Three successful title defenses
KSW Featherweight Championship (one time; former)
Knockout of the Night (one time) 
Fight of the Night (one time) 
Herakles
 2021 Fighter of the Year

Grappling

2014: ADCC European Championship - 1st place in 77 kg category (Sofia)
2015: Great Britain NAGA Championship - 1st place in the 79.5 kg class and 1st place in the 79.5 kg legs (London)
2015: ADCC European Championship - 3rd place in 77 kg class (Turku)
2016: VI Polish No-Gi Championships - 1st place in 79.5 kg category, purple stripes (Luboń)
2016: XII Polish ADCC Championships - 1st place in the 77 kg category
2018: ADCC European Championship - 2nd place in the 77 kg category (Bucharest)
2019: ADCC European Championship - 1st place in 77 kg class (Poznań)

Mixed martial arts record

|-
|Win
|align=center|22–2 (1)
|Jalin Turner
|Decision (split)
|UFC 285
|
|align=center|3
|align=center|5:00
|Las Vegas, Nevada, United States
|
|-
|Loss
|align=center|21–2 (1)
|Beneil Dariush
|Decision (unanimous)
|UFC 280
|
|align=center|3
|align=center|5:00
|Abu Dhabi, United Arab Emirates
|
|-
|Win
|align=center|21–1 (1)
|Arman Tsarukyan
|Decision (unanimous)
|UFC on ESPN: Tsarukyan vs. Gamrot
|
|align=center|5
|align=center|5:00
|Las Vegas, Nevada, United States
|
|-
|Win
|align=center|20–1 (1)
|Carlos Diego Ferreira
|TKO (submission to knee to the body)
|UFC Fight Night: Lewis vs. Daukaus
|
|align=center|2
|align=center|3:26
|Las Vegas, Nevada, United States
|
|-
|Win
|align=center|19–1 (1)
|Jeremy Stephens
|Submission (kimura)
|UFC on ESPN: Makhachev vs. Moisés
|
|align=center|1
|align=center|1:05
|Las Vegas, Nevada, United States
|
|-
| Win
| align=center|18–1 (1)
| Scott Holtzman
| KO (punches)
|UFC on ABC: Vettori vs. Holland
|
| align=center| 2
| align=center| 1:22
|Las Vegas, Nevada, United States
|
|-
| Loss
| align=center|17–1 (1)
| Guram Kutateladze
|Decision (split)
|UFC Fight Night: Ortega vs. The Korean Zombie 
|
|align=center|3
|align=center|5:00
|Abu Dhabi, United Arab Emirates
|
|-
| Win
| align=center|17–0 (1)
| Marian Ziółkowski
| Decision (unanimous)
|KSW 54
|
| align=center| 5
| align=center| 5:00
|Warsaw, Poland
|
|-
| Win
| align=center| 16–0 (1)
| Norman Parke
|TKO (doctor stoppage)
|KSW 53
| 
|align=center|3
|align=center|3:02 
|Warsaw, Poland
|
|-
| Win
| align=center| 15–0 (1)
| Kleber Koike Erbst
| Decision (unanimous)
| KSW 46
| 
|align=Center|5
|align=center|5:00
|Gliwice, Poland
| 
|-
| Win
| align=center| 14–0 (1)
| Grzegorz Szulakowski
| Submission (keylock)
| KSW 42
| 
| align=center| 4
| align=center| 4:15
| Łódź, Poland
| 
|-
| NC
| align=center| 
| Norman Parke
|NC (accidental eye poke)
|KSW 40
|
|align=center|2
|align=center|4:39
|Dublin, Ireland
| 
|-
| Win
| align=center| 13–0
| Norman Parke
|Decision (unanimous)
| KSW 39
|
|align=center| 3
|align=center| 5:00
|Warsaw, Poland
|
|-
| Win
| align=center| 12–0
| Renato Gomes Gabriel
| Submission (heel hook)
|KSW 36
|
| align=center| 2
| align=center| 3:46
| Zielona Góra, Poland
|
|-
| Win
| align=center|11–0
| Mansour Barnaoui
| Decision (unanimous)
| KSW 35
| 
| align=center|3
| align=center|5:00
| Gdańsk/Sopot, Poland
|
|-
| Win
| align=center|10–0
| Marif Piraev
|TKO (punches)
| KSW 32
| 
| align=center| 2
| align=center|3:21
| London, England
|
|-
| Win
| align=center|9–0
| Rodrigo Cavalheiro Correia
|TKO (punches)
|KSW 30 
|
|align=center|3
|align=center|4:54
|Poznań, Poland
|
|-
| Win
| align=center|8–0
| Łukasz Chlewicki
| Decision (unanimous)
| KSW 29
| 
| align=center| 3
| align=center| 5:00
| Kraków, Poland
|
|-
| Win
| align=center| 7–0
| Tim Newman
| Submission (heel hook)
|Cage Warriors 72
|
|align=center|1
|align=center|1:37
|Newport, Wales
| 
|-
| Win
| align=center| 6–0
| Jefferson George
| Decision (unanimous)
| KSW 27
| 
| align=center| 3
| align=center| 5:00
| Gdańsk, Poland
| 
|-
| Win
| align=center| 5–0
| Andre Winner
| Decision (unanimous)
| KSW 24
| 
| align=center| 3
| align=center| 5:00
| Lódz, Poland
| 
|-
| Win
| align=center| 4–0
| Mateusz Zawadzki
| TKO (corner stoppage)
| KSW 23
| 
| align=center| 2
| align=center| 5:00
| Gdańsk, Poland
| 
|-
| Win
| align=center| 3–0
| Tomáš Deák
| Decision (unanimous)
| Night of Champions 5
| 
| align=center| 2
| align=center| 5:00
| Poznań, Poland
| 
|-
| Win
| align=center| 2–0
| Tomasz Matuszewski
| Submission (guillotine choke)
| Night of Champions 4
| 
| align=center| 1
| align=center| 1:11
| Poznań, Poland
|
|-
| Win
| align=center| 1–0
| Arbi Shamaev
| TKO (doctor stoppage)
| Night of Champions 3
| 
| align=center| 2
| align=center| 3:59
| Poznań, Poland
|

See also 
 List of current UFC fighters
 List of male mixed martial artists

References

External links
  
 

1990 births
Living people
Polish male mixed martial artists
Lightweight mixed martial artists
Mixed martial artists utilizing freestyle wrestling
Mixed martial artists utilizing Brazilian jiu-jitsu
Ultimate Fighting Championship male fighters
Polish male sport wrestlers
Polish practitioners of Brazilian jiu-jitsu
People awarded a black belt in Brazilian jiu-jitsu
People from Kłodzko County
20th-century Polish people
21st-century Polish people